Paul N. Goldstene (November 23, 1930February 3, 2020), was a professor of the Government department at Sacramento State University, and was an acclaimed author and teacher of political theory.  He was the author of numerous essays, reviews, and books.  Goldstene was raised in New York City and was a graduate of The University of Arizona, where he received his PhD with a doctoral dissertation on John Kenneth Galbraith in 1970.

"Goldstene teaches contemporary political thought and theory at California State University, Sacramento, where he received the  Outstanding Scholarly Achievement Award in  1995. He is the author of The Collapse of Liberal Empire, Yale University  Press (1997), Chandler & Sharp (1980); Democracy in America: Sardonic Speculations, Bucknell House (1988); The Bittersweet Century, Chandler & Sharp (1989); as well as numerous articles and reviews for scholarly publications."

Notes

External links
 The Politics of Technology - National Radio Project Transcript
 Political Theory Forum - Two Articles by Goldstene.
 

American political scientists
1930 births
2020 deaths
University of Arizona alumni
California State University, Sacramento faculty